Sir Peter David William Coulson  (born 31 March 1958), styled The Rt. Hon. Lord Justice Coulson, is an Appeal Court judge.

He was educated at Lord Wandsworth College and the University of Keele.

He was called to the bar at Gray's Inn in 1982. During his time at the Bar, he practised at Keating Chambers. 

Originally appointed to the Construction and Technology Court, in 2004, he was then appointed a judge of the High Court of Justice (Queen's Bench Division) from 2008 until 2018, when he was appointed to the Court of Appeal. Coulson is also a contributor to the White Book, the Civil Procedure guide for practitioners.

References

1958 births
Living people
People educated at Lord Wandsworth College
Alumni of Keele University
Lords Justices of Appeal
Members of Gray's Inn
Queen's Bench Division judges
Knights Bachelor
Members of the Privy Council of the United Kingdom